Barsine delicia is a moth of the family Erebidae. It was described by Charles Swinhoe in 1891. It is found in China, the Indian state of Assam and on the Indonesia island of Sumatra.

References

Moths described in 1891
Moths of Asia
Nudariina